Tongkor or Tongkhor Monastery (Tibetan:, wStong'khor Dgon), also known as Ganden Chokhorling or Dangar Gompa, is a Tibetan Buddhist monastery located in Zithang Town, Garzê County, Garzê Tibetan Autonomous Prefecture, Sichuan, China.

History
The monastery was founded by Tongkor I, Dawa Gyaltsen, in the 15th century. It was previously the largest monastery in the county with some 500 monks about the beginning of the 20th century. This had dropped to about 70 monks at the time of the 2008 crackdown.

"On April 3, 2008, troops fired upon protesters from Tongkor (Chinese: Donggu) monastery, 60 kilometers from Kardze town, killing at least 10 people. The protests were sparked by a raid on the monastery by police, the detention of a senior monk, and resentment over intensified Patriotic Education."

Some accounts claim up to 14 people were killed.

Footnotes

References
A Great Mountain Burned by Fire: China's Crackdown in Tibet. (March, 2009). A Report by the International Campaign for Tibet. Washington, B.C., Amsterdam, Berlin, Brussels. Downloadable at: 
Mayhew, Bradley and Kohn, Michael Tibet. (2005). 6th Edition. Lonely Planet. .

Buddhist monasteries in Sichuan
Gelug monasteries
1648 establishments in Asia
Garzê Tibetan Autonomous Prefecture